Darkness on the Edge of Town is the fourth studio album by American singer-songwriter Bruce Springsteen, released on June 2, 1978 through Columbia Records. Recorded following a period of legal disputes between Springsteen and his former manager Mike Appel, the sessions took place in New York City with the E Street Band from June 1977 to March 1978. Springsteen and Jon Landau co-produced, with assistance from Steven Van Zandt. The sessions yielded a large number of outtakes, several of which were given to other artists while others later appeared on compilations.

Springsteen used outside sources when writing the album's songs, including John Steinbeck novels, John Ford films, punk rock, and country music. Musically, Darkness strips the wall of sound production of its predecessor, Born to Run, for a rawer hard rock sound emphasizing the band as a whole. The lyrics on Darkness focus on ill-fortuned characters who fight back against overwhelming odds. Compared to Springsteen's previous records, the characters are more mature and the songs are less geographically tied to the Jersey Shore area. The cover photograph of Springsteen by Frank Stefanko is viewed as a physical manifestation of the album's songs.

Released almost three years after Born to Run, Darkness sold less than its predecessor but reached number five in the US, while its singles performed modestly. Springsteen promoted it on the successful Darkness Tour, his largest tour up to that point. Darkness was initially received favorably. Critics praised the music and performances but were divided  the lyrical content. In later decades, the album has attracted acclaim as one of Springsteen's best works and is viewed as the benchmark for his future career. It has appeared on lists of the greatest albums of all time and was reissued in 2010, accompanied by a documentary detailing the album's making.

Background
Bruce Springsteen released his third studio album, Born to Run, in August 1975. His breakthrough album, it was a commercial success and propelled Springsteen to worldwide fame. Following its release, Springsteen entered into disputes with his manager, Mike Appel; Appel wanted to capitalize on the album's success with a live album, while Springsteen wanted to return to studio recording with Born to Run co-producer Jon Landau. Upon realizing the poor terms of his record contract, Springsteen sued Appel in July 1976 over ownership of his work. The resulting legal proceedings prevented the songwriter from studio recording for almost a year, during which he toured the United States and Europe with the E Street Band – pianist Roy Bittan, saxophonist Clarence Clemons, organist Danny Federici, bassist Garry Tallent, guitarist Steven Van Zandt, and drummer Max Weinberg. Springsteen wrote new material on the road and at his farm home in Holmdel, New Jersey, reportedly amassing between 40 to 70 songs. The lawsuit reached a settlement on May 28, 1976, in which Springsteen bought out his contract with Appel and Appel received a lump sum and a share of royalties from his first three albums.

Production

Recording history

On June 1, 1977, four days after the legal proceedings ended, Springsteen entered Atlantic Studios in New York City with Landau and the E Street Band to record his next album. Having accumulated a large number of songs while touring, Springsteen initially focused on the pre-written material before turning his attention to unfinished numbers that had the music written first. Songs recorded or attempted at Atlantic, some of which that had been integrated into the live sets, included: "Rendezvous", "The Promise", "Frankie", "Don't Look Back", "Something in the Night", "Because the Night", "Racing in the Street", a number Springsteen wrote for Elvis Presley called "Fire", a ballad titled "One Way Street", and two rockers named "I Wanna Be with You" and "Outside Lookin' In". Unlike the sessions for Born to Run, the full band recorded the songs at once and moved quickly from number to number, often shortly after Springsteen had written them.

By September 1977, Springsteen grew frustrated with Atlantic's environment and moved recording to the Record Plant, where most of Born to Run was recorded. Weinberg, who suffered from illness during most of the sessions, remembered Springsteen demanding perfection from the musicians while simultaneously giving them little direction, saying he "lets things flow" and did not "nitpick over details". Van Zandt received a production assistance credit for helping Springsteen tighten the arrangements. Songs that took shape at this time included "Don't Look Back", "Something in the Night", "Badlands", "Streets of Fire", "Prove It All Night", and "Independence Day". "The Promised Land" took shape around late October and early November. Around this time, the new album was to be titled Badlands, running eight tracks long like Born to Run, and a mockup album sleeve was created. However, Springsteen reportedly scrapped the title to avoid confusion with Bill Chinnock's album of the same name. 

With the artist still unsatisfied, the sessions continued into November and December, recording "Adam Raised a Cain" and a Born to Run-esque number titled "Give the Girl a Kiss". The ballad "Let's Go Tonight" was rewritten as "Factory" with new lyrics and the incomplete numbers "Candy's Boy" and "The Fast Song" were combined into "Candy's Room". "Darkness on the Edge of Town" was recorded during the tail end of the sessions in March 1978; Springsteen later said the band found the song's drum sound in Record Plant's Studio A while it was being renovated. The intention to record most of the backing tracks live with minimal overdubs was thwarted by the studio's carpeted floors. The sessions reportedly yielded between 50 and 70 songs, although only 32 are known.

After nine months, recording completed in January 1978, with overdubs extending into February and March. When choosing songs for the final track list, Springsteen had a rule: "Each song had to remain sober and austere, so as to convey its message as effectively as possible." With a large amount of songs recorded, he scrapped numbers he felt did not fit the desired theme, were too bland, or too commercial. He gave several songs to other artists: "Hearts of Stone" and "Talk to Me" to Southside Johnny and the Asbury Jukes; "Because the Night" to Patti Smith; "Fire" to Robert Gordon and the Pointer Sisters; "Rendezvous" to Greg Kihn; "Don't Look Back" to the Knack; and "This Little Girl" to Gary U.S. Bonds. The tracks "Independence Day", "Drive All Night", and "Sherry Darling" were held over for Springsteen's next album, The River (1980), while others surfaced on bootlegs before officially releasing on compilations such as Tracks (1998) and The Promise (2010). On the number of outtakes, Springsteen said in a 1978 interview that he felt it "wasn't the right time" to release the extra material, nor did he want to "sacrifice the intensity" of the album.

Sound and mixing
Springsteen struggled to get the right sounds for the record, which he later admitted was due to his and Landau's inexperience as producers. He stated: "As with Born to Run, our recording process was thwarted by our seeming inability to get the most basic acceptable sounds." While Landau wanted "a highly professional, technically perfect sound", Van Zandt sought a "more garage-band tone color". Springsteen assigned engineer Jimmy Iovine to create a combination, which he and assistant engineer Thom Panunzio struggled to achieve; the former found that trying to get the guitar sound was "impossible", while the latter said the drums were the hardest to record.

Mixing extended into May 1978, specifically for "The Promised Land", resulting in the album's release being delayed by a few weeks. Iovine, suffering from exhaustion after months of recording, was eventually replaced by Los Angeles producer and engineer Chuck Plotkin, who succeeded in creating a balanced set of sounds for the project. Mastering was done by Mike Reese at the Mastering Lab in Los Angeles. Van Zandt hated the final mix, saying the record itself has some of Springsteen's "best and most important songs", but a "terrible production".

Music and lyrics

When writing the album's songs, Springsteen was influenced by numerous outside sources, particularly works that focused on themes of individuals confronted by outside forces that resonated with the singer-songwriter; these included the John Steinbeck novels The Grapes of Wrath (1939) and East of Eden (1952) and their respective film adaptations by John Ford and Elia Kazan; westerns such as Ford's The Searchers (1956); and country artists such as Hank Williams and Woody Guthrie. Springsteen also took note of rising British punk rock acts such as the Sex Pistols and the Clash, and new wave artists such as Elvis Costello. Overall, Springsteen wanted a "leaner" and "angrier" sound compared to Born to Run. He explained: "That sound wouldn't suit these songs or the people I was now writing about."

The resulting Darkness on the Edge of Town is a less commercial record that emphasizes the band as a whole and ditches the wall of sound production of its predecessor. Springsteen favored guitar solos and limited Clemons' saxophone solos, which appear on only three of the ten tracks. Several songs emphasize choruses compared to earlier songs, particularly "Badlands", "Prove It All Night", and "The Promised Land", while the verses are more anthemic than poetic. Springsteen's vocal style is also more meditative and less passionate on tracks such as "Racing in the Street", "Factory", and "Darkness on the Edge of Town". Like Born to Run, Darkness utilizes Springsteen's "four corners" method of song sequencing, wherein every song on side one of the original LP has a corresponding track on side two in the same sequence: "Badlands" and "The Promised Land" concern America and perceived hope, while "Adam Raised a Cain" and "Factory" concern father-son relationships.

According to authors Philippe Margotin and Jean-Michel Guesdon, Darkness on the Edge of Town is "driven by raw energy and the immediacy of rock 'n' roll". Writer Rob Kirkpatrick, who regarded it as the songwriter's "fiercest" record up to that point, said that with Darkness, Springsteen left R&B behind for 1970s hard rock. Partially influenced by punk rock and country, Michael Hann of The Quietus acknowledged the presence of heartland rock. Author Marc Dolan stated in his 2012 book Bruce Springsteen and the Promise of Rock 'n' Roll that the music was "whiter" than his second album, The Wild, the Innocent & the E Street Shuffle (1973), and Springsteen evoked 1960s black singing styles, such as James Brown on "Badlands" and Solomon Burke and Sam Moore on "Streets of Fire". 
 
According to a 2019 essay by scholars Kenneth Womack and Eileen Chapman, Darkness saw Springsteen "drive away from the beach and boardwalk and into the ethos of the American heartland". Featuring older and more mature characters than Born to Run, the songs on Darkness focus on ill-fortuned characters who fight back against overwhelming odds, boasting images of working and labor, class and class resentment, troubled relationships with fathers, amongst various religious references. Whereas Springsteen's previous albums were mostly set in and around the Jersey Shore area, the majority of Darkness are less characterized by a specific place and refer to other parts of the United States, from the generic American landscape to the Utah desert and Louisiana towns; although "Something in the Night" and "Racing in the Street" still take place around "The Circuit", a loop formed by Kingsley and Ocean Avenues, west of the boardwalk in Asbury Park. Springsteen later referred to the album in his 2016 autobiography as "my samurai record, all stripped down for fighting".

Side one
The opening track, "Badlands", is a loud, rocking, anthemic song with lyrics about determination to succeed in the face of oppression. Springsteen warns the listener of the price one pays when time is wasted, yet one endures the badlands until they treat you good. The autobiographical "Adam Raised a Cain" uses biblical references to portrays a torn father-son relationship, in which the son pays for the sins of the father. Musically, it is a punk-influenced rock number driven by a heavy drumbeat and a riff played simultaneously by the guitars, bass, piano, and organ. Author Peter Ames Carlin describes it as "a tense, heavy-footed blues". "Something in the Night" is a slower paced song with dark lyrics about soul-searching in a car. Thematically offering a post-Born to Run perspective, depicting a moment where an individual's dreams are halted, Springsteen reminds the listener that once someone has "something" it can easily be taken away.

Described by The Quietus Michael Hann as the album's "most musically violent moment", "Candy's Room" is a punk-influenced number led by drums. Lyrically, it is a fantasy song in which suitors trade fancy garnishments for the title subject's affection. Artist Karon Bihari, whom Springsteen briefly dated in the 1970s, claimed the song was about her. "Racing in the Street" is a somber song with a melancholic stripped-down piano backing, the rest of the instruments joining in throughout the runtime. Telling the story of a man who will not left the bleakness of life ruin his love for car racing, its characters resemble those of Born to Run "Thunder Road", albeit two or three years later. Author Marc Dolan states that the song's themes are essential to the project, when the final verse states that individualistic efforts to succeed may be inadequate and ultimately lead to failure. Margotin and Guesdon call "Racing in the Street" Springsteen's equivalent of Chuck Berry's "You Can't Catch Me" (1956) or the Beach Boys' "Don't Worry Baby" (1964).

Side two
"The Promised Land" is a country rock song with influences ranging from Van Morrison and Bob Dylan, to the Beatles and Hank Williams. More optimistic in tone, the narrator keeps his faith and strives for a "promised land" no matter what obstacles lie ahead. Springsteen said the song asks the question: "How do we honor the community and the place we came from?" "Factory" provides commentary on the repetitive aspects of the working life, depicting a factory-worker father, whose life is consumed by his job, but works to provide for his family. A partial tribute to Springsteen's father, Springsteen said the song asks the question: "How do we honor the life that our brothers or sisters and parents lived?" Musically, "Factory" is a rock and country-influenced ballad.

"Streets of Fire" is a portrait of an outcast who has abandoned everything in order to defeat his inner demons. Musically, the song is a slow rock number that features both quiet and loud sections; Springsteen's vocal performance is noted by Margotin and Guesdon for its "powerful intensity", being "on the verge of breaking". "Prove It All Night" follows a couple who are about to get married. The man tells his woman to set aside her dreams and use determination to face the challenges that confront them. Musically, it is an up-tempo rocker that builds in intensity. The final track, "Darkness on the Edge of Town", represents a unification of the album's themes of lost love, hardships, and betrayal. The narrator stands alone, has suffered misfortune and lost everything, but refuses to give up and stands tall. Springsteen later said: "By the end of Darkness, I'd found my adult voice". Primarily led by piano, the other instruments join in throughout the runtime.

Packaging 
The cover shot and inner sleeve photographs for Darkness on the Edge of Town were taken by then-unknown photographer Frank Stefanko inside his home in Haddonfield, New Jersey. Stefanko, introduced to Springsteen by Patti Smith, later revealed that he had not yet heard the album when the photo was taken and took the photos based on his perception of what he thought Springsteen wanted. In an interview with Entertainment Weekly in 2018, Stefanko stated: "My concept was to shoot Bruce Springsteen as the young man that was standing in front of me." On the cover, Springsteen appears as a tired man, hands in his jacket pockets, standing in a floral wallpaper-covered bedroom. Commentators have acknowledged Springsteen's look as a physical manifestation of the album's songs and themes. Springsteen himself recalled, "When I saw the picture I said, 'That's the guy in the songs.' I wanted the part of me that's still that guy to be on the cover. Frank stripped away all your celebrity and left you with your essence. That's what that record was about." Stefanko felt the cover portrayed a sense of timelessness that resonated with listeners both on its release and in subsequent decades. On the back cover, the songwriter appears without the jacket alongside the titles of the ten songs. The packaging was designed by Andrea Klein.

Release 
Arriving three years after Born to Run, Darkness on the Edge of Town was released on June 2, 1978, with the catalog number JC 35318. Its release coincided with new albums by the Rolling Stones (Some Girls), Bob Seger (Stranger in Town), and Foreigner (Double Vision). Columbia Records promoted the album minimally at Springsteen's request; following the media backlash of Born to Run and having gained full artistic control of his work, Springsteen wanted zero publicity for Darkness, eventually allowing Columbia to promote it in select US locations. Although highly-anticipated, the album sold less than its predecessor, but reached number five on the US Billboard Top LPs & Tape chart and remained on the chart for 167 weeks, selling more than three million copies. In the UK, it charted at number 14.

The album's accompanying singles were moderate hits according to pop culture scholar Gillian G. Gaar. The first single, "Prove It All Night" backed by "Factory", was released in June 1978, and extensively promoted by US radio stations, reaching number 33 on the Billboard Hot 100. "Badlands" was released as the second single in July and charted at number 42. "The Promised Land", backed by "Streets of Fire", was released in October in the UK and Ireland and failed to chart. Due to the album's dwindling commercial performance, Springsteen decided to increase publicity by conducting an interview with Dave Marsh in Rolling Stone, discussing the album and upcoming tour; he also hired Landau as his manager to assist in the campaign. A billboard promoting Darkness was commissioned on Los Angeles's Sunset Boulevard, which Springsteen himself defaced on July 4.

Springsteen and the E Street Band embarked on the Darkness Tour, which ran from May 23, 1978 to January 1, 1979. Over 112 concerts, the band's setlists consisted of several songs from the Darkness sessions, including the outtakes "Fire", "Because the Night", and "The Fever", all of which became fan favorites. According to Dolan, they played 74 different songs throughout the tour, and Springsteen structured the setlists the same way as the Darkness album. It was also the artist's largest tour up to that point. The band sold out stadiums and played shows upwards of three hours in length. The tour attracted critical acclaim. Dolan called it "one of the most legendary tours" in rock history, while the staff of Ultimate Classic Rock said the tour solidified Springsteen and the E Street Band as "one of the most exciting live acts in rock 'n' roll". Two months after the tour's end, recording commenced for Springsteen's next album, The River.

Critical reception 

Darkness on the Edge of Town was met with generally favorable reviews upon release. According to journalist Eric Alterman, critics who enjoyed Born to Run also liked Darkness, but "not as passionately or perhaps as innocently". Several recognized the differences in production between the two records in both positive and lights. Peter Silverton of Sounds magazine felt the production on Darkness displayed "the ill effects" of taking too much time to record, and in general, felt Darkness showed little advancement over Born to Run, with inferior songs and "only a fraction of the vitality". ZigZag magazine's John Tobler even argued the production made the record "sound like it belongs in another time and another place". On the other hand, Robert Hilburn of Los Angeles Times said that Darkness "blends the rousing musical splendor and passionate, uplifting themes of Born to Run with even stronger production touches and a more consistent, probing group of songs". A few felt the album improved with repeated listens.

The music and performances of the E Street Band and Springsteen were well-received. Some felt the production allowed Springsteen's voice to shine clearer. The Boston Globe Ernie Santosuosso noted that with the wall of sound production of Born to Run absent, it exposes "a remarkably malleable voice" in the singer-songwriter. He also recognized a "broader musical scope and dimension" than Springsteen's previous records, and felt his guitar work "confirmed his stature". Critics were divided on the lyrical content. Some felt they were overly serious, bleak, and not as uplifting as Born to Run. Others enjoyed the evolution in lyrical themes from prior records. Hilburn said Darkness takes the lyrical themes of its predecessor and "zeroes in more deeply and productively on the key questions" raised on that record. In The Village Voice, Robert Christgau found Springsteen's narratives versatile and the characters remarkable on "Badlands", "Adam Raised a Cain", and "Promised Land", writing that they showcased "how a limited genre can illuminate a mature, full-bodied philosophical insight". He deemed other songs, particularly "Streets of Fire" and "Something in the Night", more impressionistic and overblown, revealing Springsteen to be either "an important minor artist or a very flawed and inconsistent major one". 

In Rolling Stone, Marsh hailed Darkness as a landmark rock and roll record that would one day be viewed in the same vein as records such as Jimi Hendrix's Are You Experienced (1967), Van Morrison's Astral Weeks (1968), and the Who's Who's Next (1971). Marsh remarked that the subject matter of the songs fulfilled the hype that previously surrounded Springsteen. In NME, Paul Rambali said that Darkness "walks a fine line between the outrageous claims made on Springsteen's behalf and his tendency towards a grandiose, epic feel that encouraged those claims in the first place". Hilburn argued the album affirmed Springsteen as a seminal rock figure of the 1970s, equaling the magnitude of Elvis Presley and the Rolling Stones.

Darkness placed on several lists of the best albums of 1978, including at the number one position by NME. In Record Mirror and Rolling Stone, it ranked number two, behind All Mod Cons by the Jam and Some Girls by the Rolling Stones, respectively. On Darkness, the latter magazine wrote: "Springsteen came back from the nether world with a dark, self-probing record that detailed the flip side of rock & roll exhilaration with unflinching honesty." In Sounds, Darkness placed at number three, behind The Scream by Siouxsie and the Banshees and Give 'Em Enough Rope by the Clash.

Reappraisal and legacy 

In later decades, Darkness on the Edge of Town has received critical acclaim as one of Springsteen's finest works, with some considering it his best. Reviewers have recognized Darkness as the benchmark for Springsteen's future career, forming the basis of his songwriting for the next decade, and presaging efforts like Nebraska (1982) and The Ghost of Tom Joad (1995). Some even said the album embodies both Springsteen himself and what he stands for. The Guardian Keith Cameron argued: "The original album remains the bedrock of both the Bruce Springsteen legend and the ethical code by which he continues to abide. The scope of his career confirms him as a man of many parts, but in order to resolve life's eternal dilemmas requires a journey to the heart of the Darkness on the Edge of Town."

Commentators have called Darkness a timeless classic that speaks to wide-ranging audiences. Entertainment Weekly Sarah Sahim commended the combination of the raw music with the harsh details of universal life experiences, describing Darkness as an album "dedicated to the underdog", and the underdog in Springsteen's discography. Brian Kachejian of Classic Rock History argued that the brilliance lies "not in the dark picture that Springsteen had painted about his life experiences, [but] in the small glimmers of hope that resounded in many of the songs". For music critic Steven Hyden, Darkness is "the first, best example of Springsteen juxtaposing rousing rock music with miniaturist, miserabilist, Middle American storytelling". 

Other critics highlighted Springsteen's growing maturity over Born to Run, and enjoyed the more accessible lyrics compared to his earlier albums, which Debra Filcman of Ultimate Classic Rock found "verbose yet tedious". Kirkpatrick opines that while one of his best, Darkness suffers from comparisons to its predecessor, as well as from "occasional slow moments", naming "Racing in the Street".

Rankings
Darkness on the Edge of Town has appeared on numerous best-of lists. In the opinion of Pitchforks Mark Richardson, it "ranks with rock's classic albums". In 1987, a panel of rock critics and music broadcasters were polled for Paul Gambaccini's The Top 100 Rock 'n' Roll Albums of All Time, voting Darkness number 59. In 2003, it was ranked at number 151 on Rolling Stones list of the 500 greatest albums of all time, re-ranked number 150 in a 2012 revised list, and rising to number 91 in a further revision in 2020. Ten years later, the album was ranked 109th in a similar list by NME. In another list compiling the 70 best albums of the 1970s, Paste placed Darkness at number 30. The album was also included in the 2018 edition of Robert Dimery's book 1001 Albums You Must Hear Before You Die.

Reissue box set 

First re-released in 1982 and 1990, Darkness on the Edge of Town was reissued as an expanded box set on November 16, 2010. The six-disc set includes three CDs and three DVD or Blu-ray discs. This contains a remastered version of the original album, a new two-CD album titled The Promise, containing 22 previously unreleased outtakes from the Darkness sessions, a documentary on the making of the album titled The Promise: The Making of Darkness on the Edge of Town, and two DVDs of live performances. The deluxe box set contains an 80-page spiral-bound reproduction of Springsteen's original notebooks documenting the original recording sessions containing alternate lyrics, song ideas, recording details, and personal notes. The box set attracted critical acclaim and won the Grammy Award for Best Boxed or Special Limited Edition Package at the 54th Annual Grammy Awards in 2012.

Track listing

Personnel
According to the liner notes:

Bruce Springsteen – lead vocals, lead guitar, harmonica

The E Street Band
Roy Bittan – piano, backing vocals
Clarence Clemons – saxophone, backing vocals
Danny Federici – Hammond organ, glockenspiel
Garry Tallent – bass guitar
Steven Van Zandt – rhythm guitar, backing vocals
Max Weinberg – drums

Technical
Bruce Springsteen – producer
Jon Landau – producer
Steven Van Zandt – assistant producer
Jimmy Iovine – engineer, mixing
Thom Panunzio – assistant engineer
Chuck Plotkin – mixing
Mike Reese – mastering
Frank Stefanko – photography

Charts

Weekly charts

Certifications

Notes

References

Sources

External links
 Album lyrics and audio samples
 

1978 albums
Bruce Springsteen albums
Albums produced by Steven Van Zandt
Albums produced by Jon Landau
Albums recorded at Record Plant (New York City)
Columbia Records albums